Dorydrilidae is a family of annelids belonging to the order Haplotaxida.

Genera:
 Dorydrilus Piguet, 1913

References

Annelids